The BSFA Awards are given every year by the British Science Fiction Association. The BSFA Award for Best Media was given for the best media science fiction or fantasy published in the previous calendar year. It was discontinued in 1992.

Winners

1978: The Hitchhiker's Guide to the Galaxy, first series (radio series)
1979: The Hitchhiker's Guide to the Galaxy (record)
1980: The Hitchhiker's Guide to the Galaxy, second series (radio series)
1981: Time Bandits (film)
1982: Blade Runner (film)
1983: Android (film)
1984: The Company of Wolves (film)
1985: Brazil (film)
1986: Aliens (film)
1987: Star Cops (television series)
1988: Who Framed Roger Rabbit (film)
1989: Red Dwarf (television series)
1990: Twin Peaks (television series)
1991: Terminator 2: Judgment Day (film)

References

External links

 

Media
Awards established in 1978
1978 establishments in the United Kingdom
Awards disestablished in 1991
1991 disestablishments in the United Kingdom